Mitsubishi Research Institute, Inc. (in Japanese, 三菱総合研究所 or 三菱総研 for short), often called MRI, was established at the centennial anniversary of Japan's Mitsubishi Group in 1970, invested by the various companies of the group (currently capitalized at 5,302,000,000 yen), and is a Think tank, representative of Japan.  It is the consulting firm of Mitsubishi Group and now employs about 900 people.

General
Mitsubishi Research Institute, Inc., often called MRI, was established at the centennial anniversary of Japan's Mitsubishi Group in 1970, invested by the various companies of the group (currently capitalized at 5,302,000,000 yen), and is a Think tank, representative of Japan.

It is the consulting firm of Mitsubishi Group and now employs about 900 people.  It has its branches in Tokyo, Osaka and Nagoya, and keeps an office in Washington, D.C.

Subsidiaries
MRI owns subsidiaries, such as Mitsubishi Research Institute DCS, often called DCS (Diamond Computer Service), the IT support arm of Mitsubishi UFJ Financial Group (MUFG), which is jointly owned by MRI (60 percent) and MUFG (40 percent).  Separately, MUFG has its own Think tank, Mitsubishi UFJ Research and Consulting (MURC) with a staff of 700 people, a conglomeration of former Mitsubishi Bank's Diamond Business Consulting, Bank of Tokyo's Tokyo Research International, Sanwa Bank's Sanwa Research Institute and Tokai Bank's Tokai Research Institute.

Competition
Its competitors are:
 Nomura Research Institute of Nomura Group
 Mizuho Research Institute of Mizuho Financial Group
 Japan Research Institute of Sumitomo Mitsui Financial Group
 Boston Consulting Group
 Arthur D. Little
etc.

See also
 Mitsubishi Group
 Mitsubishi UFJ Financial Group
 Mitsubishi UFJ Research and Consulting
 Mitsubishi Research Institute DCS
 Think tank
 Management consulting
 IT consulting

External links
 MRI home page
 Mitsubishi UFJ Research and Consulting home page

1970 establishments in Japan
Think tanks established in 1970
Mitsubishi companies
Think tanks based in Japan
Companies listed on the Tokyo Stock Exchange